Milo Murphy's Law is an American animated television series from the creators of Phineas and Ferb, Dan Povenmire and Jeff "Swampy" Marsh, which premiered on October 3, 2016. The series revolves around the title character, Milo Murphy, who is a descendant of Edward A. Murphy Jr., the namesake of Murphy's Law, which states that anything that can go wrong will go wrong.

Series overview

Episodes

Season 1 (2016–17)

Season 2 (2019)

Shorts
As part of a promotional campaign, Disney Channel began airing the Disney Theme Song Takeover wherein supporting characters from different shows performed the theme song to the series they were in.

Notes

References 

Milo Murphy's Law
Lists of American children's animated television series episodes
Lists of Disney Channel television series episodes